The men's 200 metre freestyle S2 event at the 2012 Paralympic Games took place on 1 September, at the London Aquatics Centre.

Eight swimmers advanced to the final.

Final

References

Swimming at the 2012 Summer Paralympics